= Toronto New School =

Nonprofit secondary school in Toronto, Ontario

Coordinates: 43.6671°N 79.37815°W

Toronto New School is an independent, not for profit secondary school in Toronto, Ontario. Toronto New School opened its doors in February 2010, offering an interdisciplinary curriculum to high school students in grades 9 through 12. The school emerged after SOLA (School of Liberal Arts) went bankrupt. The principal and vice principal of SOLA created Toronto New School.

Toronto New School went bankrupt in two years.
